The Maya mouse (Peromyscus mayensis) is a species of rodent in the family Cricetidae. It is found only in Guatemala.

References

Musser, G. G. and M. D. Carleton. 2005. Superfamily Muroidea. pp. 894–1531 in Mammal Species of the World a Taxonomic and Geographic Reference. D. E. Wilson and D. M. Reeder eds. Johns Hopkins University Press, Baltimore.

External links
 picture of Maya Mouse

Peromyscus
Endemic fauna of Guatemala
Rodents of Central America
Mammals described in 1975
Taxonomy articles created by Polbot